Harmar Township is a township in Allegheny County, Pennsylvania, United States. The population was 3,136 at the 2020 census.

The township was named after Harmar Denny, a U.S. congressman and son of Ebenezer Denny.

Geography 

Streams 
Harmar Township is entirely in the Allegheny River drainage basin and contains one undeveloped state park, Allegheny Islands State Park, on three alluvial islands in the Allegheny River. Deer Creek flows through the township; it joins the Allegheny at Harmar.

Government and Politics

Surrounding and adjacent neighborhoods 
Harmar Township has six land borders, including Indiana Township to the north,  Frazer Township to the northeast, Springdale Township and Cheswick to the east, O'Hara Township to the southwest and Fox Chapel to the west.

Bordering the Allegheny River, Harmar runs adjacent with Oakmont to the south (with a direct link via Hulton Bridge) and Plum to the south and southeast.

Demographics 

At the 2000 census there were 3,242 people, 1,522 households, and 882 families living in the township.  The population density was 543.3 people per square mile (209.7/km).  There were 1,637 housing units at an average density of 274.3/sq mi (105.9/km).  The racial makeup of the township was 97.75% White, 0.68% African American, 0.09% Native American, 0.99% Asian, 0.06% from other races, and 0.43% from two or more races. Hispanic or Latino of any race were 0.56%.

There were 1,522 households, 19.8% had children under the age of 18 living with them, 45.7% were married couples living together, 9.1% had a female householder with no husband present, and 42.0% were non-families. 37.1% of households were made up of individuals, and 13.8% were one person aged 65 or older.  The average household size was 2.09 and the average family size was 2.75.

The age distribution was 17.1% under the age of 18, 5.5% from 18 to 24, 28.0% from 25 to 44, 26.9% from 45 to 64, and 22.5% 65 or older.  The median age was 45 years. For every 100 females, there were 89.9 males.  For every 100 females age 18 and over, there were 87.4 males.

The median household income was $38,625 and the median family income  was $50,054. Males had a median income of $35,731 versus $28,455 for females. The per capita income for the township was $24,486.  About 6.3% of families and 6.6% of the population were below the poverty line, including 14.8% of those under age 18 and 4.7% of those age 65 or over.

References 

Pittsburgh metropolitan area
Townships in Allegheny County, Pennsylvania
Townships in Pennsylvania